Coleophora innermongoliensis is a moth of the family Coleophoridae. It is found in Inner Mongolia, China.

The wingspan is 11.5–16 mm.

Etymology
The specific name is derived from its type locality.

References

innermongoliensis
Moths described in 2005
Moths of Asia